The 1995 Big Ten softball tournament was held at Alumni Field on the campus of the University of Michigan in Ann Arbor, Michigan.  It was the second-ever Big Ten softball tournament, and the first since 1982.  As the tournament winner, Michigan earned the Big Ten Conference's automatic bid to the 1995 NCAA Division I softball tournament. This was the first of four consecutive Big Ten softball tournaments that Michigan won from 1995–1998.

Format and seeding
The 1995 tournament was a four team double-elimination tournament. The top four teams based on conference regular season winning percentage earned invites to the tournament.

Tournament

References

Big Ten softball tournament
Tournament
Big Ten softball tournament